Rafał Ulatowski (born 26 January 1973 in Łódź) is a Polish football manager, currently serving as Lech Poznań's head of youth development. 

Previously a professional footballer as a midfielder, he has also worked as a sports commentator. His father Zdzisław was also a player and manager.

Manager career
In October 2006, he became assistant coach at Zagłębie Lubin under Czesław Michniewicz. The club won the league title in 2006–07. In October 2007 the club appointed Ulatowski as head coach. Zagłębie Lubin finished the 2007–08 season in fifth place but was relegated one division after past corruption was uncovered.

In July 2008, Ulatowski became assistant coach for the Poland national football team under Leo Beenhakker. He continued working with the Poland national team in a reduced capacity until Beenhakker was sacked in September 2009. In January 2009, he was named manager of GKS Bełchatów after the resignation of Paweł Janas and continued with the club until the end of 2009–2010 season, finishing fifth in the league.

A few days after his departure from Bełchatów, he was signed by Cracovia Kraków, taking the club's hot seat after Orest Lenczyk. The first months with the new team were far from successful, as Cracovia earned only four points in nine games and occupied the last position in the league's table. On 24 October 2010, Ulatowski resigned from his position.

On 9 November 2011 he signed a contract with Lechia Gdańsk. He had further unsuccessful spells with Miedź Legnica and a second spell with GKS Bełchatów which saw the club relegated.

He has worked with the youth and reserve system at Lech Poznań since 2016, and managed Lech's reserve team from 2019 until 2020.

References

External links 
 

1973 births
Living people
Footballers from Łódź
Polish footballers
Association football midfielders
ŁKS Łódź players
Bałtyk Gdynia players
Úrvalsdeild karla (football) players
Knattspyrnufélagið Þróttur players
Polish football managers
Zagłębie Lubin managers
GKS Bełchatów managers
MKS Cracovia managers
Lechia Gdańsk managers
Lech Poznań managers
Ekstraklasa managers
I liga managers
II liga managers
Polish expatriate footballers
Polish expatriate sportspeople in Iceland
Expatriate footballers in Iceland
Polish expatriate sportspeople
Polish expatriate football managers
Expatriate football managers in Iceland